Gilles Rondy (born 4 September 1981 in Brest, France) is an Olympic and European Champion swimmer from France. He swam for France at the 2008 Olympics, and won the 2006 European Championships in the 25 km open water event.

He has also swum the English Channel on 9 September 2004 in a time of 7 h 54 mins.

He was a member of the 2008 French Olympic team, swimming the 10 km race in Beijing.

References

1981 births
French male long-distance swimmers
Sportspeople from Brest, France
Swimmers at the 2008 Summer Olympics
Olympic swimmers of France
Living people